Colombia competed at the 2015 Pan American Games in Toronto, Canada from 10 July to 26 July 2015.

On 23 June 2015 squash player Miguel Ángel Rodríguez was named the flagbearer of the team during the opening ceremony.

Competitors
The following table lists Colombia's delegation per sport and gender.

Medalists

|style="text-align:left; width:78%; vertical-align:top;"|

|style="text-align:left; width:22%; vertical-align:top;"|

Archery

Colombia qualified the maximum team of three men and three women, for a total of six athletes.

Men

Women

Athletics

Colombia qualified 22 athletes (12 men and 10 women).

Men
Track

Field

Women
Track

Field

Combined events – Heptathlon

Baseball

Colombia qualified a men's team of 24 athletes.

Men's tournament

Roster

Group A

Beach volleyball

Colombia qualified a women's pair.

Boxing

Men

Women

Bowling

Colombia qualified a full team of two male and two female athletes.

Singles

Doubles

Canoeing

Slalom
Colombia qualified the following boats (2 male athletes):

Men

Sprint
Colombia qualified 6 athletes in the sprint discipline (1 in men's kayak, 4 in women's kayak and 1 in men's canoe).

Men

Women

Qualification Legend: QF = Qualify to final; QS = Qualify to semifinal

Cycling

BMX

Mountain biking

Road

Track

Diving

Colombia qualified six divers (four men and two women).

Men

Women

Equestrian

Fencing

Colombia qualified 13 fencers (9 men, 4 women).

Men

Women

Football

Colombia qualified a women's team of 18 athletes. Only 16 athletes were on the final roster.

Women's tournament

Roster
Head coach: Felipe Taborda

Group A

Semifinals

Gold medal match

Golf

Colombia qualified a full team of four golfers. Colombia won all three gold medals that were available in the sport.

Gymnastics

Colombia qualified twelve gymnasts (six of each gender) across all three disciplines.

Artistic
Colombia qualified gymnasts.

Men
Team & Individual Qualification

Qualification Legend: Q = Qualified to apparatus final

Women
Team & Individual Qualification

Qualification Legend: Q = Qualified to apparatus final

Rhythmic
Colombia qualified one rhythmic gymnast.

Individual

Qualification Legend: Q = Qualified to apparatus final

Trampoline
Colombia qualified 1 trampoline gymnast.

Judo

Colombia qualified a team of eight judokas (two men and six women).

Men

Women

Karate

Colombia qualified 4 karetekas (three men and one woman).

Stella Urango ruptured her knee before the games and could not compete. All three defeats were forfeits.

Racquetball

Colombia qualified a team of three men and two women for a total of five athletes.

Roller sports

Colombiaqualified a full team of six athletes (three male and three female). 4 athletes will competed in the speed events, while the other two competed in the figure skating competition.

Figure

Speed

Rugby sevens

Colombia qualified a women's team for a total of 12 athletes. This will be the first time ever that the country competes in the sport at the Pan American Games.

Women's tournament

Roster

Group A

Fifth place match

Sailing

Colombia qualified 4 boats (7 sailors).

Shooting

Colombia qualified six shooters.

Men

Swimming

Synchronized swimming

Colombia had originally qualified a full team of nine athletes, but elected to only compete with a women's duet. The team spot was reallocated to Peru.

Table tennis

Colombia qualified a women's team.

Women

Taekwondo

Colombia qualified a full team of eight athletes (four men and four women).

Men

Women

Tennis

Colombia qualified a team of six athletes (three men and two women).

Singles

Doubles

Triathlon

Colombia qualified one male triathlete.

Men

Volleyball

Colombia qualified a men's team of 12 athletes.

Men's tournament

Seventh place match

Water skiing

Colombia qualified a full team (four in water skiing, one in wakeboard).

Waterski and Wakeboard

Weightlifting

Colombia qualified a full team of 13 athletes (7 men and 6 women). All 13 members of Colombia's weightlifting team won a medal.

Men

Women

Wrestling

See also
Colombia at the 2016 Summer Olympics

References

Nations at the 2015 Pan American Games
2015
2015 in Colombian sport